Dominique Lauvard (born 30 August 1949) is a French gymnast. She competed in six events at the 1968 Summer Olympics.

References

1949 births
Living people
French female artistic gymnasts
Olympic gymnasts of France
Gymnasts at the 1968 Summer Olympics
People from Vincennes
20th-century French women